Indiavision was an Indian pay television news channel based at Kochi, Kerala, India. It broadcast in Malayalam.

History
Indiavision was launched on 14 July 2003. The network launched a second channel, YES Indiavision (Youth, Entertainment & Sports) on 14 February 2007. Due to internal problems, it stopped broadcasting on 31 March 2015.

The company was in the news twice in 2014 when its editorial team went on strike over non-payment of salaries. Tax sleuths conducted a raid at the channel's main office in Kochi and its director, Jamaludeen Farooqi, was arrested on 4 March 2015. According to reports, the channel hadn't paid service tax to the tune of almost ₹9 crore. In March 2014, the Kerala Police registered a case against Indiavision and some other media organisations for the allegations raised against Mata Amritanandamayi.

Indiavision closed down on 31 March 2015.

Programming
News
Politrics
Varanthyam (presented by Adv. A. Jayashankar)
24 Frames (International movie reviews presented by Andur Sahadevan)
Kaleidoscope
Box Office
Gallery
Raag Rang
Special Correspondent
World This Week
Debate the Week
Colour Pencil
Yugatharam
Crime Patrol
Mukhamukham – Face to Face

References

External links 
 
 Indiavision (YouTube)

Malayalam-language television channels
Television channels and stations established in 2003
Television channels and stations disestablished in 2015
Television stations in Kochi
Defunct television channels in India
2003 establishments in Kerala
2015 disestablishments in India